Samuel Holmes was an American politician in Illinois, who served as Speaker of the Illinois House of Representatives during the mid-1850s (List of speakers of the Illinois House of Representatives). He was elected from Adams County, Illinois.

He was elected Speaker of the House over Isaac N. Arnold by a vote of 36 to 28.

References

Speakers of the Illinois House of Representatives
People from Adams County, Illinois

19th-century American politicians
Year of birth missing
Year of death missing